Venezuela, officially known as the Bolivarian Republic of Venezuela, is a country on the northern coast of South America. It is a continental mainland with numerous islands located off its coastline in the Caribbean Sea. Venezuela borders Guyana to the east of the Essequibo River, Brazil to the south, and Colombia to the west. Trinidad and Tobago, Grenada, St. Lucia, Barbados, Curaçao, Bonaire, Aruba, Saint Vincent and the Grenadines and the Leeward Antilles lie just north, off the Venezuelan coast.



Airports

Public airports

Military airports

References
General

ICAO: 

IATA:

See also 

 Transport in Venezuela
 Venezuelan Air Force (Aviación Militar Venezolana, formerly Fuerza Aérea Venezolana)
 List of airports by ICAO code: S#SV - Venezuela''
 Wikipedia: WikiProject Aviation/Airline destination lists: South America#Venezuela

 
Venezuela
Airports
Airports
Venezuela